This is a list of cricketers who played first-class cricket in England in matches between the 1826 and 1840 seasons. The sport of cricket had acquired most of its modern features by this time and the period saw the establishment of roundarm bowling as an accepted practise.

County cricket clubs began to become more formally established during this period and Sussex County Cricket Club, the oldest professional sporting organisation in the world, was formerly established in 1839. This would soon be followed by formal organisations in other counties, although the County Championship was not formally established until 1890.

The players included are those known to have played in matches which were given retrospective first-class status between 1726 and 1840 inclusive.

A

B

C

D

E

F

G

H

J

K

L

M

N

O

P

Q

R

S

T

U

V

W

Y

See also
 List of English cricketers (1772–1786)
 List of English cricketers (1787–1825)
 List of English cricketers (1841–1850)
 List of English cricketers (1851–1860)
 List of English cricketers (1861–1870)

Notes

References
Note that CricketArchive is a subscription only website.

Bibliography
Carlaw D (2020) Kent County Cricketers A to Z. Part One: 1806–1914 (revised edition). (Available online at the Association of Cricket Statisticians and Historians. Retrieved 2020-12-21.)</ref>
 
 

English cricketers 1826